A  is a Japanese flat round hollow metal slit gong that hangs before the worship hall at a Shinto shrine or image hall at a Buddhist temple. By shaking the rope in front, it may be sounded by worshippers to attract the deity's attention.

Name

As denoted by its kanji, waniguchi literally means "crocodile (or alligator) mouth". It is so-named due to the instrument's striking visual resemblance.

The earliest inscribed instance of waniguchi written as it is today (鰐口) is on a bronze example at Ōtakayama Jinja (ja) in Ōgawara, Miyagi Prefecture. In recognition of its documentary significance, the waniguchi has been designated an Important Cultural Property.

Ikkō Shōnin

According to this text, when Ikkō was performing odori (dancing) nembutsu at Usa Hachimangū, Hachiman appeared and gave him a waniguchi. When Ikkō was subsequently journeying to Shikoku, the Dragon King manifested himself and requested Ikkō's gong. The sea rough, he obliged, casting it into the turbulent waters. When Ikkō reached Sanuki, a "blue-robed child" appeared from the sea, declaring that due to the merit earned Ikkō would be released from suffering and have his waniguchi returned to him. A tortoise then appeared bearing it in his mouth and returned the lost item to Ikkō. A "tortoise tooth gong" is still in the keeping of Renge-ji today.

Examples

Waniguchi are usually made of copper or bronze, although iron examples may also be found.

The earliest waniguchi that can be dated from its inscription was excavated in Matsumoto, Nagano Prefecture, in 1939, in association with what is also the earliest  that can dated from an inscription. Now in the Tokyo National Museum, it was cast in bronze with a striking area with a plum-blossom design on both front and back, surrounded by arabesque. The inscription documents its dedication by a court official to Gokuraku-ji in Chōhō 3 (1001), Yin Metal Ox.

In all, thirteen waniguchi have been designated Important Cultural Properties, dated by their dedicatory inscriptions and located as follows:
 Chōhō 3 (1001), Tokyo National Museum
 Jōō 3 (1224), Yamanashi Prefecture
 Antei 2 (1228), Ōmachi (iron)
 Katei 2 (1236), Kiyomizu-dera, kept at Kyoto National Museum (iron)
 Kenchō 6 (1254), Nara National Museum (gilt bronze)
 Bun'ei 10 (1273), Tōkyō
 Bun'ei 10 (1274), Ōtsu
 Kōan 6 (1283), Shiga Prefecture
 Shōō 6 (1293), Ōgawara
 Kamakura period, Tōdai-ji (no inscription)
 Shitoku 4 (1387), Aizubange
 Eishō 4 (1507), Rinnō-ji (gilt bronze)
 Tenbun 3 (1534), Yamaguchi

See also
 Suzu
 Shōko
 Kane
 Mokugyo
 Bonshō
 Wani (dragon)

Notes

References

Gongs
Japanese musical instruments
Japanese metalwork
Buddhism in Japan
Shinto